Jean-Martial Kipré (born 10 November 1984) is an Ivorian former professional footballer who played as a defender.

Career 
Kipré was born in Adjamé, Ivory Coast. He joined Real Salt Lake in 2007, after spending nine years with the French club Paris Saint-Germain and two years with the French club Angers SCO. He was waived at the end of the 2007 season, and moved later to SC Toulon.

Sources
 
 
 Real Salt Lake Player Registry
 Biography at mls.net

1984 births
Living people
Footballers from Abidjan
Ivorian footballers
Association football defenders
Ivory Coast under-20 international footballers
Paris Saint-Germain F.C. players
Angers SCO players
Real Salt Lake players
SC Toulon players
Major League Soccer players
AS Moulins players
Moulins Yzeure Foot players
Lyon La Duchère players
Ivorian expatriate footballers
Ivorian expatriate sportspeople in France
Expatriate footballers in France
Ivorian expatriate sportspeople in the United States
Expatriate soccer players in the United States